Kevin McDermott may refer to:

 Kevin McDermott (singer–songwriter), Scottish singer–songwriter
 Kevin McDermott (American football) (born 1990), American football long snapper